Frank O'Donnell may refer to:

 Frank O'Donnell (footballer) (1911–1952), Scottish professional footballer
 Frank O'Donnell (actor) (1907–1956), Australian actor
 Frank A. O'Donnel (1852–1906), New York politician
 Frank Hugh O'Donnell (1846–1916), Irish nationalist writer and politician
 Frank J. Hugh O'Donnell (1894–1976), Irish critic, playwright and politician
 Francis Martin O'Donnell (born 1954), Irish and international diplomat, Ambassador of the Sovereign Order of Malta to Slovakia and retired former UN Resident Coordinator